Lani in the Hawaiian language means "heaven", and in some cases, "sky." The word is derived from Proto-Polynesian *raŋi.

Lani is a relatively common name in the Hawaiian language. Last Queen of Hawaii, Liliuokalani, had a name including the term lani.

External links
Wiktionary entry for "Lani": Lani

Hawaiian words and phrases
Native Hawaiian